Nagarsol, sometimes spelled Nagarsul, is a small Indian village in located in Maharashtra, with some housing colonies built around railway station, a rural hospital, a small public bus stand and an English medium school apart from couple of vernacular schools. It falls under Nashik district under Yeola Taluka. Nagarsol is  9.9 km far from its Taluka head office town of Yeola and at a distance  of  80.4 km from its District town Nashik.

Railway station
Nagarsol  railway station-cum-terminus is managed by South Central Railway. Station code is NSL. Nagarsol is located at a distance of  44 km away from famous pilgrimage center of Shirdi. The trains coming from South terminate here. From Nagarsol transport is available to Shridi which is one hour drive.

Nagarsol falls as a station under Secunderabad–Manmad line, which was originally built by Hyderabad–Godavari Valley Railways owned by Nizam's Guaranteed State Railway in year 1900 by Nizam of Hyderabad.

Some of the trains which terminate at Nagarsol are:
 Nagarsol–Nanded Passenger
 Narasapur–Nagarsol Express (via Warangal) 17214
 Narasapur–Nagarsol Express (via Guntur) 17232
 Chennai Central–Nagarsol Weekly Express
 Nagarsol–Jalna DEMU
 Nagarsol–Kacheguda Express

References

Villages in Nashik district